Diaphania columbiana is a moth in the family Crambidae. It was described by George Hampson in 1899. It is found in Guatemala, Colombia, Ecuador, Peru, Bolivia and Paraguay.

The length of the forewings is 13–15 mm for males and 14 mm for females. The wings have a distinct purple gloss. The forewings have brown costal and external bands and a translucent white area of without yellow scales. There is a brown band on the hindwings, as well as a translucent white area.

References

Moths described in 1899
Diaphania